Hillair Fettes (1 March 1898 – 31 December 1971) was a Luxembourgian wrestler. He competed in the Greco-Roman featherweight event at the 1924 Summer Olympics.

References

External links
 

1898 births
1971 deaths
Olympic wrestlers of Luxembourg
Wrestlers at the 1924 Summer Olympics
Luxembourgian male sport wrestlers
Place of birth missing